"Coleman High School" may refer to one of the following public secondary schools in the United States:
 John A. Coleman Catholic High School
 Coleman High School (Arkansas), a segregated high school in Pine Bluff, Arkansas from 1915 to 1971
 Coleman High School (Texas), located in Coleman, Texas
 Coleman High School (Wisconsin), located in Coleman, Wisconsin